Stephanie Bennett (born Margaret Stephanie Bennett) is an English film producer known for her works Hail! Hail! Rock 'n' Roll and Endless Harmony.

Biography

Stephanie Bennett established Delilah Films, her first production company, after co-producing The Compleat Beatles in 1984 which sold over one million copies and became a model for the company's future documentaries and concert films.

Bennett has worked with musical artists around the world, including The Beach Boys, Joni Mitchell, The Everly Brothers, Chuck Berry and Roy Orbison.  She went on to produce Endless Harmony: The Beach Boys, Woman Of Heart And Mind: The Joni Mitchell Story, The Everly Brothers Reunion Concert,  Rock ’n’ Roll Odyssey, and Hail, Hail Rock ’n’ Roll about Chuck Berry. Bennett's Endless Harmony was nominated for a Long Form Music Video Grammy Award in 2001.

Bennett also created Cinemax Sessions, a series focusing on music legends and artists paying tribute to them, including Roy Orbison's Black and White Night, featuring Bruce Springsteen, Elvis Costello, Bonnie Raitt, Jackson Browne, KD Lang, JD Souther and T-Bone Burnett, backed by James Burton and Elvis Presley's band.

Delilah Films has also produced numerous documentaries and concerts for PBS, MTV, VHI, and HBO, including Tom Petty: Going Home, Black Sabbath: Volumes One And Two, and Foreigner: Their Story

Bennett has also established a New Zealand–based production company, Rongo Productions.  She is currently working on "Mindspaces: The Artists Studio with Denis O'Connor"'.

Filmography
Cool Cats: 25 Years of Rock 'n Roll Style
The Compleat Beatles
Hail! Hail! Rock 'n' Roll
Joni Mitchell: Woman of Heart & Mind
A Reggae Session
Roy Orbison and Friends: A Black and White Night
Smokey Robinson: The Quiet Legend
Toots and Maytals: Live From New Orleans
Ray Charles: A Romantic Evening at the McCallum Theater
Deep Purple: Heavy Metal Pioneers
The Doors: Live in Europe 1968
Black Sabbath: The Black Sabbath Story, Volume 1
Troubadours of Folk Music
The Beach Boys: Nashville Sounds
Hey, Hey We're the Monkees
Endless Harmony: The Beach Boys Story
Chapel of Love: Jeff Barry and Friends
Shining Stars: The Story of Earth, Wind and Fire
The Doors: Soundstage Performances
Return to 'Sin City': A Tribute to Gram Parsons
On Stage at the World Cafe Live (Television)
Chicago and Earth, Wind, & Fire
Boys II Men Motown: A journey through Hitsville USA Live
Chris Bailey: Ringa Whau
Headland: Where Nature meets Sculpture
Christine: The Artist Goldsmith

References

External links
Rongo Productions

English film producers
Living people
Year of birth missing (living people)